"Oklahoma Indian Jazz" is a dance tune written in 1923 by Ray Hibbler, T.J. Johnsen, J.W. Barna, J.J. Murrin, and T. Guarini. It was advertised as a fox trot.

Early recordings
Ace Brigode & His Ten Virginians, Okeh 40014 (1923).
Benson Orchestra of Chicago, Victor 19257-B (1923)
Sol Wagner & His Orchestra, Gennett 5313-B (1923)

References

Bibliography
Hibbler, Ray; Johnsen, T.J.; Barna, J.W.; Murrin, J.J.; Guarini, T. (w. & m.). "Oklahoma Indian Jazz" (Sheet music). New York: Joe Morris Music Co. (1923).

External links
"Oklahoma Indian Jazz," Benson Orchestra of Chicago (Victor 19257, 1923)—Benson Orchestra of Chicago; Red Hot Jazz.
“Oklahoma Indian Jazz,”  Benson Orchestra of Chicago, on the National Jukebox, Library of Congress

1923 songs
Jazz songs
Foxtrots